Bikinisesongen is a 1994 Norwegian comedy film directed by Runar Jarle Wiik, starring Thor-Ivar Forsland and Eduardo Verdu. The film features the friends Snorre (Verdu) and Leo (Forsland), two boys who dream of making quick money, without much success. The buy a truckload of bikinis and head for Western Norway to make sales, ignoring that it is already late autumn.

References

External links
 
 Bikinisesongen at Filmweb.no (Norwegian)
 Bikinisesongen at the Norwegian Film Institute

1994 films
1994 comedy films
Norwegian comedy films
1990s Norwegian-language films